Viking Airport  is an airport which is located  northwest of Viking, Alberta, Canada.

See also
Viking (South) Aerodrome

References

External links
Place to Fly on COPA's Places to Fly airport directory

Registered aerodromes in Alberta
Beaver County, Alberta